The South American U20 Championships in Athletics are the South American championships in the sport of athletics which is open for those in the junior age category (19 years or under). It is organized by the South American Athletics Confederation (CONSUDATLE).

The competition was first held in 1959 in Buenos Aires. It was an annual event from its inaugural year until 1962, at which point it was held every two years. The championships became an annual event again over the period between 1983 and 2003, but reverted to a biennial format from then onwards.

Awards

Medals are awarded for individuals and relay team members for the first three places in each event.

Trophies are awarded to teams in each category (male and female) with the highest total number of cumulative points in the entire competition. In addition, a trophy will be given to the country for the overall title.

A trophy is also presented to both a male and a female athlete for the most outstanding performance.

Editions

* = The Champions for men's 10,000m, both Race Walking and Combined Events were extracted from the classification of the 2007 Pan American Junior Championships.

** = The Champions for men's 10,000m, both Race Walking and Combined Events were extracted from the classification of the 2009 Pan American Junior Championships.

Medal table(1959-2021)

Championship records

Men

 * = assembled from gbrathletics.com (heats not considered)

Women

 * = assembled from gbrathletics.com (heats not considered)

References

External links

 
Continental athletics championships
Under-20 athletics competitions
Recurring sporting events established in 1959
Athletics U20
U20
Biennial athletics competitions
South American youth sports competitions